FC Volna Pinsk is a Belarusian football club based in Pinsk, Brest Oblast. The club plays in the Belarusian First League.

History
The club was established in 1987 as Kommunalnik Pinsk. The club spent all its seasons after 1992 at the 2nd of 3rd level of Belarusian football. They came close to promotion to the top level several times in the 1990s, finishing in the top three of the Belarusian First League on four occasions, and losing in the promotion/relegation play-offs in fall 1995 to Shinnik Bobruisk.

In 1996–2006, it was known as FC Pinsk-900. In 2006, the club changed its name to Volna Pinsk as the previously existed Pinsk army club that existed after the World War II.

Current squad
As of February 2023

Recent seasons
{|class="wikitable"
|-bgcolor="#efefef"
! Season
! League
! Pos.
! Pl.
! W
! D
! L
! GS
! GA
! P
!Cup
!Notes
!Manager
|-
|align=right|1992
|align=right bgcolor=#ffa07a|2D
|align=right|3
|align=right|15||align=right|8||align=right|4||align=right|3
|align=right|20||align=right|13||align=right|20
|align=right|1st round
|align=right|
|
|-
|align=right|1992–93
|align=right bgcolor=#ffa07a|2D
|align=right|5
|align=right|30||align=right|15||align=right|4||align=right|11
|align=right|52||align=right|40||align=right|34
|align=right|1st round
|align=right|
|
|-
|align=right|1993–94
|align=right bgcolor=#ffa07a|2D
|align=right bgcolor=#cc9966|3
|align=right|28||align=right|17||align=right|6||align=right|5
|align=right|58||align=right|21||align=right|40
|align=right|Quarter-finals
|align=right|
|
|-
|align=right|1994–95
|align=right bgcolor=#ffa07a|2D
|align=right bgcolor=#cc9966|3
|align=right|30||align=right|16||align=right|8||align=right|6
|align=right|45||align=right|26||align=right|40
|align=right|2nd round
|align=right|
|
|-
|align=right|1995
|align=right bgcolor=#ffa07a|2D
|align=right bgcolor=silver|2
|align=right|14||align=right|9||align=right|2||align=right|3
|align=right|22||align=right|13||align=right|29
|align=right rowspan=2|Last 32
|align=right|
|
|-
|align=right|1996
|align=right bgcolor=#ffa07a|2D
|align=right|5
|align=right|24||align=right|10||align=right|8||align=right|6
|align=right|40||align=right|19||align=right|38
|align=right|
|
|-
|align=right|1997
|align=right bgcolor=#ffa07a|2D
|align=right|5
|align=right|30||align=right|12||align=right|8||align=right|10
|align=right|43||align=right|36||align=right|44
|align=right|Last 32
|align=right|
|
|-
|align=right|1998
|align=right bgcolor=#ffa07a|2D
|align=right bgcolor=#cc9966|3
|align=right|30||align=right|17||align=right|8||align=right|5
|align=right|54||align=right|22||align=right|59
|align=right|Last 32
|align=right|
|
|-
|align=right|1999
|align=right bgcolor=#ffa07a|2D
|align=right|15
|align=right|30||align=right|6||align=right|8||align=right|16
|align=right|33||align=right|50||align=right|26
|align=right|Last 32
|align=right|Relegated
|
|-
|align=right|2000
|align=right bgcolor=#98bb98|3D – B
|align=right|6
|align=right|16||align=right|5||align=right|4||align=right|7
|align=right|17||align=right|24||align=right|19
|align=right|1st round
|align=right|
|
|-
|align=right|2001
|align=right bgcolor=#98bb98|3D
|align=right|7
|align=right|34||align=right|17||align=right|3||align=right|14
|align=right|61||align=right|37||align=right|54
|align=right|2nd round
|align=right|
|
|-
|align=right|2002
|align=right bgcolor=#98bb98|3D
|align=right bgcolor=silver|2
|align=right|24||align=right|16||align=right|4||align=right|4
|align=right|50||align=right|22||align=right|52
|align=right|2nd round
|align=right|Promoted
|
|-
|align=right|2003
|align=right bgcolor=#ffa07a|2D
|align=right|16
|align=right|30||align=right|5||align=right|4||align=right|21
|align=right|28||align=right|59||align=right|19
|align=right|1st round
|align=right|Relegated
|
|-
|align=right|2004
|align=right bgcolor=#98bb98|3D
|align=right|4
|align=right|24||align=right|15||align=right|5||align=right|4
|align=right|62||align=right|25||align=right|50
|align=right|2nd round
|align=right|
|
|-
|align=right|2005
|align=right bgcolor=#98bb98|3D
|align=right bgcolor=silver|2
|align=right|26||align=right|21||align=right|4||align=right|1
|align=right|57||align=right|16||align=right|67
|align=right|2nd round
|align=right|Promoted
|
|-
|align=right|2006
|align=right bgcolor=#ffa07a|2D
|align=right|8
|align=right|26||align=right|10||align=right|4||align=right|12
|align=right|47||align=right|48||align=right|34
|align=right|1st round
|align=right|
|
|-
|align=right|2007
|align=right bgcolor=#ffa07a|2D
|align=right|7
|align=right|26||align=right|11||align=right|6||align=right|9
|align=right|34||align=right|38||align=right|39
|align=right|2nd round
|align=right|
|
|-
|align=right|2008
|align=right bgcolor=#ffa07a|2D
|align=right|4
|align=right|26||align=right|15||align=right|3||align=right|8
|align=right|39||align=right|34||align=right|48
|align=right|2nd round
|align=right|
|
|-
|align=right|2009
|align=right bgcolor=#ffa07a|2D
|align=right|7
|align=right|26||align=right|11||align=right|6||align=right|9
|align=right|34||align=right|38||align=right|39
|align=right|Last 16
|align=right|
|
|-
|align=right|2010
|align=right bgcolor=#ffa07a|2D
|align=right|10
|align=right|30||align=right|11||align=right|2||align=right|17
|align=right|31||align=right|48||align=right|35
|align=right|2nd round
|align=right|
|
|-
|align=right|2011
|align=right bgcolor=#ffa07a|2D
|align=right|7
|align=right|30||align=right|13||align=right|6||align=right|11
|align=right|52||align=right|38||align=right|45
|align=right|2nd round
|align=right|
|
|-
|align=right|2012
|align=right bgcolor=#ffa07a|2D
|align=right|8
|align=right|28||align=right|8||align=right|10||align=right|10
|align=right|24||align=right|45||align=right|34
|align=right|2nd round
|align=right|
|
|-
|align=right|2013
|align=right bgcolor=#ffa07a|2D
|align=right|12
|align=right|30||align=right|11||align=right|6||align=right|13
|align=right|30||align=right|41||align=right|39
|align=right|Last 16
|align=right|
|
|-
|align=right|2014
|align=right bgcolor=#ffa07a|2D
|align=right|16
|align=right|30||align=right|4||align=right|8||align=right|18
|align=right|26||align=right|62||align=right|20
|align=right|Last 32
|align=right|Relegated
|
|-
|align=right|2015
|align=right bgcolor=#98bb98|3D – B
|align=right|5
|align=right|18||align=right|9||align=right|5||align=right|4
|align=right|43||align=right|18||align=right|32
|align=right|Last 32
|align=right|
|
|-
|align=right|2016
|align=right bgcolor=#98bb98|3D
|align=right bgcolor=gold|1
|align=right|24||align=right|19||align=right|3||align=right|2
|align=right|87||align=right|20||align=right|60
|align=right|Last 32
|align=right|Promoted
|
|-
|align=right|2017
|align=right bgcolor=#ffa07a|2D
|align=right|7
|align=right|30||align=right|13||align=right|4||align=right|13
|align=right|48||align=right|48||align=right|43
|align=right|Last 32
|align=right|
|
|-
|align=right|2018
|align=right bgcolor=#ffa07a|2D
|align=right|13
|align=right|28||align=right|6||align=right|7||align=right|15
|align=right|23||align=right|49||align=right|25
|align=right|Last 32
|align=right|
|
|-
|align=right|2019
|align=right bgcolor=#ffa07a|2D
|align=right|12
|align=right|28||align=right|5||align=right|6||align=right|17
|align=right|29||align=right|49||align=right|21
|align=right|Last 32
|align=right|
|
|-
|}

External links
Official website

Volna Pinsk
Volna Pinsk
1987 establishments in Belarus
Association football clubs established in 1987